In enzymology, a phosphoribosylformylglycinamidine synthase is an enzyme that catalyzes the chemical reaction

ATP + N2-formyl-N1-(5-phospho-D-ribosyl)glycinamide + L-glutamine + H2O  ADP + phosphate + 2-(formamido)-N1-(5-phospho-D-ribosyl)acetamidine + L-glutamate

The 4 substrates of this enzyme are ATP, N2-formyl-N1-(5-phospho-D-ribosyl)glycinamide, L-glutamine, and H2O, whereas its 4 products are ADP, phosphate, 2-(formamido)-N1-(5-phospho-D-ribosyl)acetamidine, and L-glutamate.

This enzyme belongs to the family of ligases, specifically those forming carbon-nitrogen bonds carbon-nitrogen ligases with glutamine as amido-N-donor.  The systematic name of this enzyme class is N2-formyl-N1-(5-phospho-D-ribosyl)glycinamide:L-glutamine amido-ligase (ADP-forming). Other names in common use include phosphoribosylformylglycinamidine synthetase, formylglycinamide ribonucloetide amidotransferase, phosphoribosylformylglycineamidine synthetase, FGAM synthetase, FGAR amidotransferase, 5'-phosphoribosylformylglycinamide:L-glutamine amido-ligase, (ADP-forming), 2-N-formyl-1-N-(5-phospho-D-ribosyl)glycinamide:L-glutamine, and amido-ligase (ADP-forming). 

It is known as ADE6 in Saccharomyces cerevisiae (budding yeast) genetics.

Structural studies

Regulation
This enzyme participates in purine metabolism. Oncogenic and physiological signals lead to the ERK-dependent PFAS phosphorylation at the T619 site, stimulating de novo purine synthesis flux. In addition, ERK-mediated PFAS phosphorylation is required for cell and tumor growth.

References

EC 6.3.5
Enzymes of known structure